The  (abbreviated OKH) was the high command of the Army of Nazi Germany. It was founded in 1935 as part of Adolf Hitler's rearmament of Germany. OKH was de facto the most important unit within the German war planning until the defeat at Moscow in December 1941.

During World War II, OKH had the responsibility of strategic planning of Armies and Army Groups. The General Staff of the OKH managed operational matters. Each German Army also had an Army High Command ( or AOK). The Armed Forces High Command then took over this function for theatres other than the Eastern front.

The OKH commander held the title of Commander-in-chief of the Army. After the Battle of Moscow, the OKH commander Field marshal Walther von Brauchitsch was removed from office, and Hitler appointed himself as Commander-in-Chief of the Army.

OKH vs OKW
OKH had been independent until February 1938, when Hitler created the Oberkommando der Wehrmacht which, on paper, subordinated OKH to OKW. After a major crisis developed in the Battle of Moscow, von Brauchitsch was dismissed (partly because of his failing health), and Hitler appointed himself as head of the OKH. At the same time, he limited the OKH's authority to the Russian front, giving OKW direct authority over army units elsewhere. This enabled Hitler to declare that only he had complete awareness of Germany's strategic situation, should any general request a transfer of resources between the Russian front and another theatre of operations.

Although both OKW and OKH were headquartered in the Maybach complex in Nazi Germany, the functional and operational independence of both establishments were not lost on the respective staff during their tenure. Personnel at the compound remarked that even if Maybach 2 (the OKW complex) was completely destroyed, the OKH staff in Maybach 1 would scarcely notice. These camouflaged facilities, separated physically by a fence, also maintained structurally different mindsets towards their objectives.

On 28 April 1945 (two days before his suicide), Hitler formally subordinated OKH to OKW, giving the latter command of forces on the Eastern Front.

Organisation
In 1944, these elements were subordinate to the OKH:
 C.-in-C. Reserve Army and Chief of Equipment: Friedrich Fromm
 Chief of Army General Division: Friedrich Olbricht
 Chief of Army Ordnance: Emil Leeb
 Chief of Army Personnel Division: Rudolf Schmundt
 Chief of Army Administrative Division : Herbert Osterkamp
 Army Propaganda and Public Relations Office: Hasso von Wedel – Albrecht Blau – Kurt Dittmar
 Inspector General of Armoured Troops: Heinz Guderian
 General officer commanding for Engineers and Fortifications: Alfred Jacob
 Inspector General for Officer Cadets: Karl-Wilhelm Specht

Leadership

Commander-in-Chief of the Army 
The Commander-in-Chief of the Army was the head of the OKH and the German Army during the years of the Nazi regime.

Chief of the OKH General Staff 

The Chiefs of the OKH General Staff were:

See also 
 German general staff
 Glossary of World War II German military terms
 Maybach I and II
 Oberste Heeresleitung, the German Empire's highest army command during World War I

Notes

References

External links
"Not the Stuff of Legend: The German High Command in World War II" – lecture by Dr. Geoffrey Megargee, author of Inside Hitler's High Command, available at the official YouTube channel of the U.S. Army Heritage and Education Center

German High Command during World War II
German Army (1935–1945)
National army headquarters